Mirjam van Hemert (born 30 September 1950) is a retired Dutch swimmer who won a bronze medal in the 4×100 m freestyle relay at the 1966 European Aquatics Championships. She also competed at the 1968 Summer Olympics in the 100 m freestyle and 4×100 m freestyle relay, but failed to reach the finals. She won a national title in the 100 m freestyle in 1968.

References

1950 births
Living people
Dutch female freestyle swimmers
Olympic swimmers of the Netherlands
Swimmers at the 1968 Summer Olympics
People from Vlaardingen
European Aquatics Championships medalists in swimming
Sportspeople from South Holland
20th-century Dutch women